Social history, often called the new social history, is a field of history that looks at the lived experience of the past. In its "golden age" it was a major growth field in the 1960s and 1970s among scholars, and still is well represented in history departments in Britain, Canada, France, Germany, and the United States. In the two decades from 1975 to 1995, the proportion of professors of history in American universities identifying with social history rose from 31% to 41%, while the proportion of political historians fell from 40% to 30%.  In the history departments of British and Irish universities in 2014, of the 3410 faculty members reporting, 878 (26%) identified themselves with social history while political history came next with 841 (25%).

Charles Tilly, one of the best known social historians, identifies the tasks of social history as: 1) “documenting large structural changes; 2) reconstructing the experiences of ordinary people in the course of those changes; and (3) connecting the two” (1985:P22).

Since the 1990s, economists have used cliometrics with economic and mathematical models as a quantitative means to study social history. 2023

Old and new social history
The older social history (before 1960) included numerous topics that were not part of the mainstream historiography of political, military, diplomatic and constitutional history. It was a hodgepodge without a central theme, and it often included political movements, such as Populism, that were "social" in the sense of being outside the elite system. Social history was contrasted with political history, intellectual history and the history of great men. English historian G. M. Trevelyan saw it as the bridging point between economic and political history, reflecting that, "Without social history, economic history is barren and political history unintelligible." While the field has often been viewed negatively as history with the politics left out, it has also been defended as "history with the people put back in."

New social history movement
The "new social history" movement exploded on the scene in the 1960s, emerged in the UK and quickly become one of the dominant styles of historiography there as well in the US and in Canada. It drew on developments within the French Annales School, was very well organized, dominated French historiography, and influenced much of Europe and Latin America. Jürgen Kocka finds two meanings to "social history."  At the simplest level, it was the subdivision of historiography that focused on social structures and processes. In that regard, it stood in contrast to political or economic history. The second meaning was broader, and the Germans called it Gesellschaftsgeschichte. It is the history of an entire society from a social-historical viewpoint.

In Germany the Gesellschaftsgeschichte movement introduced a vast range of topics, as Kocka, a leader of the Bielefeld School recalls:
In the 1960s and 1970s, "social history" caught the imagination of a young generation of historians. It became a central concept -- and a rallying point -- of historiographic revisionism. It meant many things at the same time. It gave priority to the study of particular kinds of phenomena, such as classes and movements, urbanization and industrialization, family and education, work and leisure, mobility, inequality, conflicts and revolutions. It stressed structures and processes over actors and events. It emphasized analytical approaches close to the social sciences rather than by the traditional methods of historical hermeneutics. Frequently social historians sympathized with the causes (as they saw them) of the little people, of the underdog, of popular movements, or of the working class. Social history was both demanded and rejected as a vigorous revisionist alternative to the more established ways of historiography, in which the reconstruction of politics and ideas, the history of events and hermeneutic methods traditionally dominated.

Americanist Paul E. Johnson recalls the heady early promise of the movement in the late 1960s:
The New Social History reached UCLA at about that time, and I was trained as a quantitative social science historian. I learned that "literary" evidence and the kinds of history that could be written from it were inherently elitist and untrustworthy. Our cousins, the Annalistes, talked of ignoring heroes and events and reconstructing the more constitutive and enduring "background" of history. Such history could be made only with quantifiable sources. The result would be a "History from the Bottom Up" that ultimately engulfed traditional history and, somehow, helped to make a Better World. Much of this was acted out with mad-scientist bravado. One well-known quantifier said that anyone who did not know statistics at least through multiple regression should not hold a job in a history department. My own advisor told us that he wanted history to become "a predictive social science."  I never went that far. I was drawn to the new social history by its democratic inclusiveness as much as by its system and precision. I wanted to write the history of ordinary people—to historicize them, put them into the social structures and long-term trends that shaped their lives, and at the same time resurrect what they said and did. In the late 1960s, quantitative social history looked like the best way to do that.

The Social Science History Association was formed in 1976 to bring together scholars from numerous disciplines interested in social history. It is still active and publishes Social Science History quarterly. The field is also the specialty of the Journal of Social History, edited since 1967 by Peter Stearns  It covers such topics as gender relations; race in American history; the history of personal relationships; consumerism; sexuality; the social history of politics; crime and punishment, and history of the senses. Most of the major historical journals have coverage as well.

However, after 1990 social history was increasingly challenged by cultural history, which emphasizes language and the importance of beliefs and assumptions and their causal role in group behavior.

Subfields

Historical demography

The study of the lives of ordinary people was revolutionized in the 1960s by the introduction of sophisticated quantitative and demographic methods, often using individual data from the census and from local registers of births, marriages, deaths and taxes, as well as theoretical models from sociology such as social mobility.  H-DEMOG is a daily email discussion group that covers the field broadly.

Historical demography is the study of population history and demographic processes, usually using census or similar statistical data. It became an important specialty inside social history, with strong connections with the larger field of demography, as in the study of the Demographic Transition.

African-American history
Black history or African-American history studies African Americans and Africans in American history. The Association for the Study of African American Life and History was founded by Carter G. Woodson in 1915 and has 2500 members and publishes the Journal of African American History, formerly the Journal of Negro History. Since 1926 it has sponsored Black History Month every February.

Ethnic history
Ethnic history is especially important in the US and Canada, where major encyclopedias helped define the field. It covers the history of ethnic groups (usually not including Black or Native Americans). 
Typical approaches include critical ethnic studies; comparative ethnic studies; critical race studies; Asian-American, and Latino/a or Chicano/a studies.  In recent years Chicano/Chicana studies has become important as the Hispanic population has become the largest minority in the US.
 
The Immigration and Ethnic History Society was formed in 1976 and publishes a journal for libraries and its 829 members.
The American Conference for Irish Studies, founded in 1960, has 1,700 members and has occasional publications but no journal.
 The American Italian Historical Association was founded in 1966 and has 400 members; it does not publish a journal
The American Jewish Historical Society is the oldest ethnic society, founded in 1892; it has 3,300 members and publishes American Jewish History
 The Polish American Historical Association was founded in 1942, and publishes a newsletter and Polish American Studies, an interdisciplinary, refereed scholarly journal twice each year.
 H-ETHNIC is a daily discussion list founded in 1993 with 1400 members; it covers topics of ethnicity and migration globally.

Labor history

Labor history, deals with labor unions and the social history of workers. See for example Labor history of the United States  The Study Group on International Labor and Working-Class History was established: 1971 and has a membership of 1000.  It publishes International Labor and Working-Class History. H-LABOR is a daily email-based discussion group formed in 1993 that reaches over a thousand scholars and advanced students. the Labor and Working-Class History Association formed in 1988 and publishes Labor: Studies in Working-Class History.

Kirk (2010) surveys labour historiography in Britain since the formation of the Society for the Study of Labour History in 1960. He reports that labour history has been mostly pragmatic, eclectic and empirical; it has played an important role in historiographical debates, such as those revolving around history from below, institutionalism versus the social history of labour, class, populism, gender, language, postmodernism and the turn to politics. Kirk rejects suggestions that the field is declining, and stresses its innovation, modification and renewal. Kirk also detects a move into conservative insularity and academicism. He recommends a more extensive and critical engagement with the kinds of comparative, transnational and global concerns increasingly popular among labour historians elsewhere, and calls for a revival of public and political interest in the topics. Meanwhile, Navickas, (2011) examines recent scholarship including the histories of collective action, environment and human ecology, and gender issues, with a focus on work by James Epstein, Malcolm Chase, and Peter Jones.

Women's history
Women's history exploded into prominence in the 1970s, and is now well represented in every geographical topic; increasingly it includes gender history. Social history uses the approach of women's history to understand the experiences of ordinary women, as opposed to "Great Women," in the past. Feminist women's historians have critiqued early studies of social history for being too focused on the male experience.

Gender history
Gender history focuses on the categories, discourses and experiences of femininity and masculinity as they develop over time. Gender history gained prominence after it was conceptualized in 1986 by Joan W. Scott in her article "Gender: A Useful Category of Historical Analysis." Many social historians use Scott's concept of "perceived differences" to study how gender relations in the past have unfolded and continue to unfold. In keeping with the cultural turn, many social historians are also gender historians who study how discourses interact with everyday experiences.

History of the family

The History of the family emerged as a separate field in the 1970s, with close ties to anthropology and sociology. The trend was especially pronounced in the US and Canada. It emphasizes demographic patterns and public policy, but is quite separate from genealogy, though often drawing on the same primary sources, such as censuses and family records.

The influential pioneering study Women, Work, and Family (1978) was done by Louise A. Tilly and Joan W. Scott. It broke new ground with their broad interpretive framework and emphasis on the variable factors shaping women's place in the family and economy in France and England. The study considered the interaction of production, or traditional labor, and reproduction, the work of caring for children and families, in its analysis of women's wage labor and thus helped to bring together labor and family history.  Much work has been done on the dichotomy in women's lives between the private sphere and the public. For a recent worldwide overview covering 7000 years see Maynes and Waltner's 2012 book and ebook, The Family: A World History (2012). For comprehensive coverage of the American case, see Marilyn Coleman and Lawrence Ganong, eds. The Social History of the American Family: An Encyclopedia (4 vol, 2014).

The history of childhood is a growing subfield.

History of education

For much of the 20th century, the dominant American historiography, as exemplified by Ellwood Patterson Cubberley (1868-1941) at Stanford, emphasized the rise of American education as a powerful force for literacy, democracy, and equal opportunity, and a firm basis for higher education and advanced research institutions. It was a story of enlightenment and modernization triumphing over ignorance, cost-cutting, and narrow traditionalism whereby parents tried to block their children's intellectual access to the wider world.  Teachers dedicated to the public interest, reformers with a wide vision, and public support from the civic-minded community were the heroes.  The textbooks help inspire students to become public schools teachers and thereby fulfill their own civic mission.

The crisis came in the 1960s, when a new generation of New Left scholars and students rejected the traditional celebratory accounts, and identified the educational system as the villain for many of America's weaknesses, failures, and crimes. Michael Katz (1939-2014) states they:
tried to explain the origins of the Vietnam War; the persistence of racism and segregation; the distribution of power among gender and classes; intractable poverty and the decay of cities; and the failure of social institutions and policies designed to deal with mental illness, crime, delinquency, and education.

The old guard fought back and bitter historiographical contests, with the younger students and scholars largely promoting the proposition that schools were not the solution to America's ills, they were in part the cause of Americans problems. The fierce battles of the 1960s died out by the 1990s, but enrollment in education history courses never recovered.

By the 1980s, compromise had been worked out, with all sides focusing on the heavily bureaucratic nature of the American public schooling.

In recent years most histories of education deal with institutions or focus on the ideas histories of major reformers, but a new social history has recently emerged, focused on who were the students in terms of social background and social mobility. In the US attention has often focused on minority and ethnic students. In Britain, Raftery et al. (2007) looks at the historiography on social change and education in Ireland, Scotland, and Wales, with particular reference to 19th-century schooling. They developed distinctive systems of schooling in the 19th century that reflected not only their relationship to England but also significant contemporaneous economic and social change. This article seeks to create a basis for comparative work by identifying research that has treated this period, offering brief analytical commentaries on some key works, discussing developments in educational historiography, and pointing to lacunae in research.

Historians have recently looked at the relationship between schooling and urban growth by studying educational institutions as agents in class formation, relating urban schooling to changes in the shape of cities, linking urbanization with social reform movements, and examining the material conditions affecting child life and the relationship between schools and other agencies that socialize the young.

The most economics-minded historians have sought to relate education to changes in the quality of labor, productivity and economic growth, and rates of return on investment in education.  A major recent exemplar is Claudia Goldin and Lawrence F. Katz, The Race between Education and Technology (2009), on the social and economic history of 20th-century American schooling.

Urban history

The "new urban history" emerged in the 1950s in Britain and in the 1960s in the US. It looked at the "city as process" and, often using quantitative methods, to learn more about the inarticulate masses in the cities, as opposed to the mayors and elites.  A major early study was Stephan Thernstrom's Poverty and Progress: Social Mobility in a Nineteenth Century City (1964), which used census records to study Newburyport, Massachusetts, 1850–1880. A seminal, landmark book, it sparked interest in the 1960s and 1970s in quantitative methods, census sources,  "bottom-up" history, and the measurement of upward social mobility by different ethnic groups. Other exemplars of the new urban history included Kathleen Conzen,  Immigrant Milwaukee, 1836-1860 (1976); Alan Dawley, Class and Community: The Industrial Revolution in Lynn (1975; 2nd ed. 2000); Michael B. Katz,  The People of Hamilton, Canada West (1976); Eric H. Monkkonen, The Dangerous Class: Crime and Poverty in Columbus Ohio 1860-1865 (1975); and Michael P. Weber, Social Change in an Industrial Town: Patterns of Progress in Warren, Pennsylvania, From Civil War to World War I. (1976).

Representative comparative studies include Leonardo Benevolo, The European City (1993);  Christopher R. Friedrichs, The Early Modern City, 1450-1750 (1995), and James L. McClain, John M. Merriman, and Ugawa Kaoru. eds. Edo and Paris (1994) (Edo was the old name for Tokyo).

There were no overarching social history theories that emerged developed to explain urban development. Inspiration from urban geography and sociology, as well as a concern with workers (as opposed to labor union leaders), families, ethnic groups, racial segregation, and women's roles have proven useful. Historians now view the contending groups within the city as "agents" who shape the direction of urbanization. The subfield has flourished in Australia—where most people live in cities.

Rural history

Agricultural History handles the economic and technological dimensions, while Rural history handles the social dimension.  Burchardt (2007) evaluates the state of modern English rural history and identifies an "orthodox" school, focused on the economic history of agriculture. This historiography has made impressive progress in quantifying and explaining the output and productivity achievements of English farming since the "agricultural revolution." The celebratory style of the orthodox school was challenged by a dissident tradition emphasizing the social costs of agricultural progress, notably enclosure, which forced poor tenant farmers off the land. Recently, a new school, associated with the journal Rural History, has broken away from this narrative of agricultural change, elaborating a wider social history. The work of Alun Howkins has been pivotal in the recent historiography, in relation to these three traditions. Howkins, like his precursors, is constrained by an increasingly anachronistic equation of the countryside with agriculture. Geographers and sociologists have developed a concept of a "post-productivist" countryside, dominated by consumption and representation that may have something to offer historians, in conjunction with the well-established historiography of the "rural idyll."  Most rural history has focused on the American South—overwhelmingly rural until the 1950s—but there is a "new rural history" of the North as well. Instead of becoming agrarian capitalists, farmers held onto preindustrial capitalist values emphasizing family and community. Rural areas maintained population stability; kinship ties determined rural immigrant settlement and community structures; and the defeminization of farm work encouraged the rural version of the "women's sphere." These findings strongly contrast with those in the old frontier history as well as those found in the new urban history.

Religion

The historiography of religion focuses mostly on theology and church organization and development. Recently the study of the social history or religious behavior and belief has become important.

Social history in Europe

UK
Social history is associated in the United Kingdom with the work of E.P. Thompson in particular, and his studies The Making of the English Working Class and Whigs and Hunters: The Origin of the Black Act. Emerging after the second world war, it was consciously opposed to traditional history's focus on 'great men', which it counter-posed with 'History from below' (also known as People's History).

Thus in the UK social history has often had a strong political impetus, and can be contrasted sharply with traditional history's (partial) documentation of the exploits of the powerful, within limited diplomatic and political spheres, and its reliance on archival sources and methods (see historical method and archive) that exclude the voices of less powerful groups within society. Social history has used a much wider range of sources and methods than traditional history and source criticism, in order to gain a broader view of the past. Methods have often including quantitative data analysis and, importantly, Oral History which creates an opportunity to glean perspectives and experiences of those people within in society that are unlikely to be documented within archives. Eric Hobsbawm was an important UK social historian, who has both produced extensive social history of the UK, and has written also on the theory and politics of UK social history. Eric Hobsbawm and EP Thompson were both involved in the pioneering History Workshop Journal.

Ireland has its own historiography.

France

Social history has dominated French historiography since the 1920s, thanks to the central role of the Annales School.  Its journal Annales focuses attention on the synthesizing of historical patterns identified from social, economic, and cultural history, statistics, medical reports, family studies, and even psychoanalysis.

Germany

Social history developed within West German historiography during the 1950s-60s as the successor to the national history discredited by National Socialism.  The German brand of "history of society" - Gesellschaftsgeschichte - has been known from its beginning in the 1960s for its application of sociological and political modernization theories to German history. Modernization theory was presented by Hans-Ulrich Wehler (1931-2014) and his Bielefeld School as the way to transform "traditional" German history, that is, national political history, centered on a few "great men," into an integrated and comparative history of German society encompassing societal structures outside politics. Wehler drew upon the modernization theory of Max Weber, with concepts also from Karl Marx, Otto Hintze, Gustav Schmoller, Werner Sombart and Thorstein Veblen.

In the 1970s and early 1980s German historians of society, led by Wehler and Jürgen Kocka at the "Bielefeld school"  gained dominance in Germany by applying both modernization theories and social science methods. From the 1980s, however, they were increasingly criticized by proponents of the "cultural turn" for not incorporating culture in the history of society, for reducing politics to society, and for reducing individuals to structures. Historians of society inverted the traditional positions they criticized (on the model of Marx's inversion of Hegel). As a result, the problems pertaining to the positions criticized were not resolved but only turned on their heads. The traditional focus on individuals was inverted into a modern focus on structures, the traditional focus on culture was inverted into a modern focus on structures, and traditional emphatic understanding was inverted into modern causal explanation.

Hungary
Before World War II, political history was in decline and an effort was made to introduce social history in the style of the French Annales School.  After the war only Marxist interpretations were allowed.  With the end of Communism in Hungary in 1989. Marxist historiography collapsed and social history came into its own, especially the study of the demographic patterns of the early modern period. Research priorities have shifted toward urban history and the conditions of everyday life.

Soviet Union
When Communism ended in 1991, large parts of the Soviet archives were opened.  The historians' data base leapt from a limited range of sources to a vast array of records created by modern bureaucracies. Social history flourished.

Canada

Social history had a "golden age" in Canada in the 1970s, and continues to flourish among scholars. Its strengths include demography, women, labour, and urban studies.

Africa 
Events of Africa’s general social history since the 20th century refer to the colonial era for most of the countries with the exception of Ethiopia and Liberia, which are never colonized. Major processes in the continent involve resistance, independence, reconstruction, self-rule, and the process of modern politics including the formation of the African Union. Post-colonial milestones towards stability, economic growth, and unity have been made with continuous developments. Natural phenomena and subsequent economic effects have been more pronounced in countries such as Ethiopia followed by ethnic-based social crises and violence in the 21st century— that led to the mass migration of youth and skilled workers. Political and economic stability with respect to measures taken by international donor groups such as sanctions and subsequent responses from various nationals to such measures and Pan-Africanism are other dimensions of Africa’s social history.

Political history
While the study of elites and political institutions has produced a vast body of scholarship, the impact after 1960 of social historians has shifted emphasis onto the politics of ordinary people—especially voters and collective movements. Political historians responded with the "new political history," which has shifted attention to political cultures. Some scholars have recently applied a cultural approach to political history.  Some political historians complain that social historians are likely to put too much stress on the dimensions of class, gender and race, reflecting a leftist political agenda that assumes outsiders in politics are more interesting than the actual decision makers.

Social history, with its leftist political origins, initially sought to link state power to everyday experience in the 1960s. Yet by the 1970s, social historians increasingly excluded analyses of state power from its focus. Social historians have recently engaged with political history through studies of the relationships between state formation, power and everyday life with the theoretical tools of cultural hegemony and governmentality.

See also 
 Annales School
 History of sociology
 List of history journals
 Living history and open-air museums
 Oral History
 People's History

Practitioners
Salo Baron (1895–1989), Jewish history
Marc Bloch (1886–1944), Medieval, Annales School
Asa Briggs, Baron Briggs, (1921 - 2018) British
Martin Broszat (1926–1989), Germany
Merle Curti (1897-1997) American 
Natalie Zemon Davis, (b. 1928) France
Herbert Gutman (1928-1985), American black and labor history
Eugene D. Genovese (1930-2012), American slavery
S. D. Goitein (1900-1985), Medieval Jewish history in Fustat and environs
Oscar Handlin (1915-2011), American ethnic
Emmanuel Le Roy Ladurie (b. 1929), leader of Annales School, France
Ram Sharan Sharma (1919-2011), India
Stephan Thernstrom (b. 1934), ethnic American; social mobility
 Charles Tilly (1929 – 2008), European; theory
 Louise A. Tilly (1930 - 2018), Europe; women and family 
Eric Hobsbawm (1917-2012), labor history, social movements and resistances
E. P. Thompson (1924–1993), British labour
Hans-Ulrich Wehler (1931-2014), 19th-century Germany, Bielefeld School

Notes

Bibliography
 Adas, Michael. "Social History and the Revolution in African and Asian Historiography," Journal of Social History 19 (1985): 335–378.
 Anderson, Michael. Approaches to the History of the Western Family 1500-1914 (1995) 104pp excerpt and text search
 Cabrera, Miguel A.  Postsocial History: An Introduction. (2004). 163 pp.
 Cayton, Mary Kupiec, Elliott J. Gorn, and Peter W. Williams, eds. Encyclopedia of American Social History (3 vol 1993) 2653pp; long articles pages by leading scholars; see v I: Part II, Methods and Contexts, pp 235–434
 Cross, Michael S. "Social History," Canadian Encyclopedia (2008) online
 Cross, Michael S. and Kealey, Gregory S., eds.  Readings in Canadian Social History (5 vol 1984). 243 pp.
 Dewald, Jonathan.  Lost Worlds: The Emergence of French Social History, 1815-1970. (2006). 241 pp.
 Eley, Geoff.  A Crooked Line: From Cultural History to the History of Society. (2005). 301 pp.
 Fairburn, Miles.  Social History: Problems, Strategies and Methods. (1999). 325 pp.
 Fass, Paula, ed. Encyclopedia of Children and Childhood: In History and Society, (3 vols. 2003).
 Fletcher, Roger. "Recent Developments in West German Historiography: the Bielefeld School and its Critics." German Studies Review 1984 7(3): 451–480.  Fulltext: in Jstor
 Hareven, Tamara K.  "The History of the Family and the Complexity of Social Change," American Historical Review, (1991) 96#1 pp 95–124 in JSTOR
 Harte, N. B. "Trends in publications on the economic and social history of Great Britain and Ireland, 1925-74." Economic History Review 30.1 (1977): 20–41. online
 Henretta, James. "Social History as Lived and Written," American Historical Review 84 (1979): 1293-1323 in JSTOR
 Himmelfarb, Gertrude. “The Writing of Social History: Recent Studies of 19th Century England.” Journal of British Studies 11.1  pp. 148–170. online
 Kanner, Barbara.  Women in English Social History, 1800-1914: A Guide to Research (2 vol 1988–1990). 871 pp.
 Lloyd, Christopher.  Explanation in Social History. (1986). 375 pp.
 Lorenz, Chris. "'Won't You Tell Me, Where Have All the Good Times Gone'? On the Advantages and Disadvantages of Modernization Theory for History." Rethinking History 2006 10(2): 171–200.  Fulltext: Ebsco
 Mintz, Steven. Huck's Raft: A History of American Childhood (2006). excerpt and text search
 Mintz, Steven and Susan Kellogg. Domestic Revolutions: A Social History Of American Family Life (1989) excerpt and text search
 Mosley, Stephen. "Common Ground: Integrating Social and Environmental History," Journal of Social History, Volume 39, Number 3, Spring 2006, pp. 915–933, relations with Environmental History, in Project MUSE
Muehlbauer, Matthew S., and David J. Ulbrich, eds. The Routledge History of Global War and Society (2018)  
 Myhre, Jan Eivind. "Social History in Norway in the 1970s and Beyond: Evolution and Professionalisation." Contemporary European History 28.3 (2019): 409-421 online
 Palmer, Bryan D., and Todd McCallum, "Working-Class History" Canadian Encyclopedia (2008)
 Pomeranz, Kenneth. "Social History and World History: from Daily Life to Patterns of Change." Journal of World History 2007 18(1): 69–98.  Fulltext: in History Cooperative and Project MUSE
 Stearns, Peter N. "Social History Today ... And Tomorrow," Journal of Social History 10 (1976): 129–155.
 Stearns, Peter N. "Social History Present and Future." Journal of Social History. Volume: 37. Issue: 1. (2003). pp 9+. online edition
 Stearns,  Peter, ed. Encyclopedia of Social History (1994) 856 pp.
 Stearns,  Peter, ed. Encyclopedia of European Social History from 1350 to 2000 (5 vol 2000), 209 essays by leading scholars in 3000 pp.
 Sutherland, Neil. "Childhood, History of," Canadian Encyclopedia (2008)
 Hobsbawm, Eric. The Age of Revolution: Europe 1789-1848.
  Skocpol, Theda,  and Daniel Chirot, eds. Vision and method in historical sociology (1984).
 Thompson, E. P.  The Essential E. P. Thompson. (2001). 512 pp.  highly influential British historian of the working class
  Thompson, F. M. L., ed.  The Cambridge Social History of Britain, 1750-1950." Vol. 1: Regions and Communities.  Vol. 2: People and Their Environment; Vol. 3: Social Agencies and Institutions. (1990). 492 pp.
 Tilly, Charles. "The Old New Social History and the New Old Social History," Review 7 (3), Winter 1984: 363-406 (online)
 Tilly, Charles. Big Structures, Large Processes, Huge Comparisons (1984).
 Timmins, Geoffrey. "The Future of Learning and Teaching in Social History: the Research Approach and Employability." Journal of Social History 2006 39(3): 829-842.  Fulltext: History Cooperative and Project MUSE
 Wilson, Adrian, ed.  Rethinking Social History: English Society, 1570-1920 and Its Interpretation. (1993). 342 pp.
 Zunz, Olivier, ed. Reliving the Past: The Worlds of Social History, (1985) online edition

Primary sources
 Binder, Frederick M. and David M. Reimers, eds. The Way We Lived: Essays and Documents in American Social History.'' (2000). 313 pp.

External links

American Social History Project, NEH project—print, visual, and multimedia on US social and cultural history
Social History Society (UK); news items; also posts from authors of recent new books in social and cultural history.
Victorian-era social history, British 19c
Society for the social history of medicine, organization of historians studying social impact of medicine
"Social History Portal", guide to  900.000 digital objects in social history at 13 organizations 
International Institute of Social History, presents research & new data on the global history of work, workers, and labour relations

 
Fields of history
History